Jobs Sister is a mountain summit located near Lake Tahoe in northern California.

Description
Jobs Sister is situated on the common border that El Dorado County shares with Alpine County, as well as the boundary Eldorado National Forest shares with Humboldt-Toiyabe National Forest. It is set on the crest of the Carson Range which is a subset of the Sierra Nevada. The Tahoe Rim Trail traverses the northern slope of the mountain, providing an approach option. This landform's toponym has been officially adopted by the U.S. Board on Geographic Names, and was named by the Whitney Survey on an 1881 map. It is named in association with Jobs Peak (1.3 mile east) which in turn is named for Mormon settler, Moses Job, who operated a store in Carson Valley in the 1850s.

Climate
According to the Köppen climate classification system, Jobs Sister is located in an alpine climate zone. Most weather fronts originate in the Pacific Ocean, and travel east toward the Sierra Nevada mountains. As fronts approach, they are forced upward by the peaks (orographic lift), causing them to drop their moisture in the form of rain or snowfall onto the range.

Gallery

See also

References

External links
 Weather forecast: Jobs Sister

Mountains of the Sierra Nevada (United States)
Mountains of El Dorado County, California
Mountains of Alpine County, California
Eldorado National Forest
Humboldt–Toiyabe National Forest
Mountains of Northern California
North American 3000 m summits